Arthur Norman may refer to:

 Arthur Norman (industrialist) (1917–2011), British industrialist
 Arthur Charles Alfred Norman (1858–1944), British architect 
 Arthur Norman (computer scientist), British computer scientist
 Arthur St. Norman (1878–1956), South African long-distance runner